Adrian Klimczak (born 26 July 1997) is a Polish professional footballer who plays as a left-back for Wieczysta Kraków.

Career

ŁKS Łódź
On 19 December 2018, ŁKS Łódź announced the signing of Klimczak on a contract until 2021.

Wieczysta Kraków
On 9 June 2022, Klimczak moved to IV liga side Wieczysta Kraków on a three-year deal.

References

1997 births
Living people
People from Police, West Pomeranian Voivodeship
Association football defenders
Polish footballers
Gryf Wejherowo players
Olimpia Grudziądz players
Arka Gdynia players
ŁKS Łódź players
Ekstraklasa players
I liga players
II liga players
III liga players